Ethnic youth dormitories are a traditional institution among several ethnic societies of the world including the various ethnic groups of India, the ethnic groups of South-East Asia, and the native Americans.

Among many ethics groups, the youth dormitory is a now declining or defunct institution. For example, among several ethnic groups of Northeast India, the traditional dormitories (called Morung) became dysfunctional in the 20th century, with the advent of modern educational institutions and Christianity. However, among some ethnic groups, such as the Nagas, it has continued to exist as a socio-cultural institution.

Names 
Different ethnic groups have different names for their youth dormitories:

 Arüju among Aos; the Ao girls slept in a separate house called Tsuki, which was chapreoned by a widow.
 Bukumatala in Trobriand Islands
 Buonzawl among Hmars
 Calpule in Guatemala
 Champo among Lothas
 Chu or Chupang in the Yangpi village of Nagaland
 Dai in Palau
 Dekha Chang among Sümis (only for males)
 Dhangarbasa or Dhangarbassa among Bhuyans
 Dhumkuria among Oraons, including Jonkh-erpa for boys and Pelo-erpa for girls
 Ghotul or Gotul among Gonds, common for both males and females
 Giti-O or Gitiora among Mundas such as Birhors and Hos; separate for boys and girls
 Hangseuki (boys) and Leoseuki (girls) among Zeme
 Ikhuichi (boys) and Illoichi (girls) among the Mao Nagas (Memis)
 Imieum in New Hebrides
 Khangchu / Khangchiu (for boys) and Luchu / Liuchiu / Kailiu (for girls) in Rongmei language
 Kichuki among Angamis
 Kwod among the tribes of Torres Strait Islands
 Lochii among Maos
 Loho in Sulawesi
 Longshim among Tangkhuls, including Mayarlong for boys and Ngalalong for girls
 Louchizii Fii among Poumais
 Maro or Terang among Mikirs
 Morung (boys) and Yo (girls) among the Konyaks
 Moshup or Mosup among Adis / Abors
 Nedrong or Nodrong among Dimasa Kacharis
 Nokpanti among Garos
 Raliiki among Marams
 Rang-bang among Bhotiyass, common for both males and females
 Rensi, Azughu, or Awikhu among the Rengmas
 Roemah Kompani in Kai Islands
 Romaluli in Flores
 Sochem (boys) and Shemshimang (girls) among the Changs; the Changs also have another morung-like institution called haki, but it is not a bachelor's dormitory. It is used as a guard house, a council hall, a religious institution, a drum house, and a repository for war trophies.
 Ti in Marquesas Islands
 Zawlbuk among Kukis

In northeast India, Morung is a common name for the traditional youth clubs or bachelors' dormitories. It is an Ahom or Assamese language word.

Functions 
Traditionally, after attaining a certain age (as young as 4–5 years among the Oraons), the ethnic youths would attend the dormitory. Generally, they ceased to be a member of the organization when they married. In some cases, as in Ghotul, widowed people were admitted to the dormitory. The dormitories' affairs are usually managed by senior members, including elected office-bearers.

The functions of the youth dormitories vary from group to group, and may include:

 Teaching conjugal duties
 Teaching social duties
 Teaching clan lore
 Impart training in tribal art, music and dance
 Providing workforce for the community efforts such as shifting cultivation, house-building, elder care, and festival organization
 A sleeping place for young tribals in villages that had very small homes without much privacy
 Defence of the village (for example, among the Dimasa Kacharis)

Among some ethnic groups, the dormitories also served as a place for courtship among young men and women. These dormitories admitted both men and women. For example, among some Gonds (such as Asurs and Marias) and Khonds, boys and girls sleep in the same dormitory. These functions have changed with times; for example, according to a 1966 survey, the traditional Arju dormitory had largely disappeared from the Ao Naga village of Waromung. In its place, there were two Church-controlled gender-specific dormitories, whose main function was to ensure segregation of unmarried boys and girls. Some tribal dormitories traditionally accept only males, and some have separate dormitories for males and females. For example, among the Mundas, the boys and girls would sleep in separate dormitories at night; in the villages that did not have a dormitory for the girls, the girls would sleep in the house of old women.

Among some of the Nagas, such as the Angamis, the dormitory was an insignificant institution. Among others, it was an important institution and the nominees of the dormitory (morung) served on the village council.

Among some ethnic groups, the dormitories had additional special functions. For example, the Lothas used to keep their sacred stones in the dormitory. The Aos used to hang the heads of their headhunting victims and rewarded the headhunters at the dormitory during the Moatsü festival.

The activities of the dormitories varied from group to group. They included education, story-telling, singing, dancing, sex education, festive celebrations, religious ceremonies, and socio-political activities. The dormitories may train the members in hunting-gathering, fishing, wood-cutting, arts and crafts, agriculture, and other jobs. Among some ethnic groups, the members were expected to help in the village activities such as agriculture and house-building.

The dormitories were generally located near the village chief's house (as among the Oraons), in forest away from the village (as in Bastar district), in the centre of the village, or among the fields (as among the Konyaks). Typically, the dormitories were located in distinctive building structures, and were decorated with totemic emblems.

Some villages had multiple dormitories, such as for each section (khel) of the village among some Naga ethnic groups. The Sümis built miniature dormitories as a fertility rite.

References

Bibliography 

 
 
 
 
 
 
 
 
 
 
 

House types
Tribes
Indigenous culture